The Ford Falcon (XA) is a full-size car that was produced by Ford Australia from 1972 to 1973. It was the first iteration of the third generation of the Falcon and also included the Ford Fairmont (XA)—the luxury-oriented version. The XA platform was also used for the Australian Ford Landau.

Overview
Sold between March 1972 and September 1973, the XA series was the first Falcon to be designed (with assistance from Ford's US headquarters) and manufactured in Australia. Designed by Jack Telnack, it featured an entirely new body which was larger and more roomy than that of its XY series predecessor, giving it the "coke-bottle" look. The XA range also had a longer list of options, although the choice of engines carried over from the previous XY Falcon range. All V8 302 CID and most 351 CID "Cleveland" engines were now Aussie made. GT Falcons could have Aussie or imported 351 CID V8s fitted. 
Wagons, utilities and panel vans now featured a longer wheelbase than the sedan.  Fairmont wagons had a dual-action tailgate that could be opened either downwards or sideways, optional on base model Falcon and Falcon 500 Wagons.

The addition of a two-door hardtop to the range marked the first time that this body style had been offered on an Australian Falcon since the XP series of 1965–1966. The hardtop's longer doors with frameless windows were shared with the utility and van, with a different shape glass to suit the commercial vehicles' body apertures. The shorter doors of the sedan and wagon with their framed windows were also available with optional quarter vent windows, though these were very rare, mainly fitted to cars in the hotter parts of Australia. This option was available in the subsequent XB and XC models, though very scarce.

The XA Falcon range were the first Falcons fitted with in-dash vents for face level flow-thru ventilation, although they only worked while the car was in motion.

A total of 129,473 XAs were built. While successful, the XA Falcon range proved to be short-lived as it gained a significant frontal appearance update to become the XB series in September 1973.

Model range
Sedans and Wagons were introduced in March 1972, the Hardtops in August 1972  and the Utilities and Vans in October of that year.

Grand Sport Rally Pack 
A Grand Sport Rally Pack was offered on Falcon, Falcon 500 and Fairmont models. The XA GS had rally stripes that ran from the front indicators to the end of the rear doors. It also shared many options as used on the GT Falcon, such as the 12 slot steel wheels with plain brushed centre caps, the three spoke wooden rimmed steering wheel with rim squeeze horn and full GT dash instrumentation featuring tachometer, odometer, oil pressure, water temperature and voltmeter as standard. For the first time the GS model range was also available as a two-door hardtop and was also offered as an option on utes and panel vans. A  two barrel version of the  Cleveland V8 was also available as an option on the GS sedans only. The GS could also be fitted with the Option 56 ‘driving lights’ grille which was standard on the GT, however, the GT bonnet with NACA style ducts was not available as an option on the XA GS.

Falcon GTHO Phase IV

As the previous XW and XY series Falcon GT sedans, an extra-high-performance limited-production version of the XA Falcon GT sedan, the GT-HO Phase IV, was developed by Ford Australia for homologation in Group E Series Production Touring Car racing, targeting in particular the 1972 Hardie-Ferodo 500 at Bathurst. Production of the required 200 examples was abandoned in July 1972 following intense media and political pressure, and only one production example was completed. This significant road car was manufactured in Calypso Green metallic with a white vinyl interior, and has recently been completely restored.

Additionally, three regular production Falcon GT sedans - especially painted in Brambles Red - had been in the process of being developed for racing to GT-HO specification by Ford Special Vehicles Division and were to be raced at Bathurst in 1972 by factory drivers Allan Moffat and Fred Gibson. With the abandonment of the XA Falcon GT-HO as a production car, development was immediately halted on the three race cars and they were sold off. However, one of these cars did go on to serve a life in motorsport, specifically as a rally car campaigned by Bruce Hodgson. It was later destroyed in a road accident. Although the three cars featured standard Falcon GT compliance plates, they are considered by most Ford fans to be race-prepared versions of the XA Falcon GT-HO Phase IV.

Howard Marsden, head of Lot 6, designated the race cars as follows XA-1 Allan Moffat (Carthew); XA-2 Gibson (Bowden); XA-3 (Hodgson).

Falcon GT - RPO 83
Between April 1973 and August 1973, Ford Australia built 250 XA Falcon GTs fitted with the RPO 83 package, 130 of these being sedans and 120 being hardtops. RPO 83 comprised three variations from the standard XA Falcon GT, these being of a Holley 780 carburettor, 2.25 inch exhaust headers and a clutch slave cylinder hydraulic pipe heat shield. Pricing and external appearance did not vary from the standard models. The 2.25 inch exhaust headers were subsequently homologated for the XA Falcon GT for Group C Touring Car racing, including the 1973 Hardie-Ferodo 1000.

Falcon 500 Superbird - RPO 77

Following the positive public reaction given to its XA Falcon GT Hardtop-based “Superbird” show car at the 1973 Melbourne Motor Show, Ford Australia released a limited production “Superbird” to the public. The production Superbird was an XA Falcon 500 Hardtop fitted with an option package designated as RPO 77. The package included the Australian-built 302 cubic inch Cleveland V8 engine, sports suspension, Grand Sport Rally Pack instrumentation and a rear window louvre. Three contrasting paints schemes matched with colour-coded wheel centres were offered, the choices being Polar White with Cosmic Blue accent, Yellow Fire with Walnut Glow accent and Lime Glaze with Jewel Green accent. Large "Superbird" decals adorned the rear quarter panels and the rear-mounted "Falcon 500" badging was retained. The advertised production run was 750 units; however, the actual production total is thought to have been lower. The entire production run was completed in the months of March through May 1973.

Falcon GS 
The XA Falcon GS was also released in full GTHO exterior trim. Having the flutes in both, bonnet and front guards. It also had all the GT blackouts, not the typical GS stripe. Also has tags with 302 code but actually have 351 crank and so forth. They are very rare, not many are known to have been made.

Motorsport
Allan Moffat and Ian Geoghegan won the 1973 Hardie-Ferodo 1000 at Bathurst in a factory entered XA Falcon GT Hardtop and John Goss and Kevin Bartlett won the 1974 Hardie-Ferodo 1000 in a privately entered example.

References

External links

 Ford Falcon XA Superbird, www.uniquecarsandparts.com.au

XA
Cars of Australia
Cars introduced in 1972
XA Falcon
Sedans
Station wagons
Coupé utilities
Vans
Rear-wheel-drive vehicles
1970s cars
Muscle cars